Ecclesiastes 11:3 is the third verse in the eleventh chapter of the Book of Ecclesiastes in the Hebrew Bible.

Content 
The verse reads as follows in several scriptural translations:

 Westminster Leningrad Codex (Hebrew): ""
 Septuagint (Greek): ""
 King James Version (English): "If the clouds be full of rain, they empty themselves upon the earth: and if the tree fall toward the south, or toward the north, in the place where the tree falleth, there it shall be."
 New American Standard Bible (English): "If the clouds are full, they pour out rain upon the earth; and whether a tree falls toward the south or toward the north, wherever the tree falls, there it lies."

Eschatological interpretation 
The wide interpretation of the verse is that the fallen tree refers to the eschatological state of a human soul after death. Methodist writer Joseph Benson notes that:...and if the tree fall, &c. — As if he had said, Therefore, let us just now bring forth the fruits of righteousness, because death will shortly cut us down, and we shall then be determined to unchangeable happiness or misery, according as our works have been.

Likewise, the Jamieson-Fausset-Brown Bible Commentary says:So man's character is unchangeable, whether for hell or heaven, once that death overtakes him.

References

Ecclesiastes 11
Hebrew Bible verses